Corona Apartments is a historic three-story building in Salt Lake City, Utah. It was built by the Bowers Building Company in 1925, and designed in the Prairie School style. It has been listed on the National Register of Historic Places since October 20, 1989.

References

National Register of Historic Places in Salt Lake City
Prairie School architecture in Utah
Residential buildings completed in 1925
1925 establishments in Utah